
Following is the list of 2001 PGA Tour Qualifying School graduates, the 36 professional golfers who earned their 2002 PGA Tour card through Q School in 2001.

Players in yellow were 2002 PGA Tour rookies.

2002 Results

*PGA Tour rookie in 2002
T = Tied 
Green background indicates the player retained his PGA Tour card for 2003 (finished inside the top 125). 
Yellow background indicates the player did not retain his PGA Tour card for 2003, but retained conditional status (finished between 126-150). 
Red background indicates the player did not retain his PGA Tour card for 2003 (finished outside the top 150).

Winners on the PGA Tour in 2002

Runners-up on the PGA Tour in 2002

See also
2001 Buy.com Tour graduates

References
Player profiles
Money list

PGA Tour Qualifying School
PGA Tour Qualifying School Graduates
PGA Tour Qualifying School Graduates